Irvington is an unincorporated community located in the town of Menomonie, Dunn County, Wisconsin, United States. Irvington is located on the Red Cedar State Trail and has parking facilities for trail access.

References

Unincorporated communities in Dunn County, Wisconsin
Unincorporated communities in Wisconsin